Sergio Mena may refer to:

 Sergio Mena (journalist) (born 1975), Spanish journalist and university professor
 Sergio Mena (footballer) (born 2000), Colombian footballer